The Westfort Hospital is a 250-bed hospital in Thrissur, Kerala, India. The hospital was founded in 1989. It was the first private hospital in Thrissur to establish a Trauma Unit with neurology and neurosurgical facilities, a spiral C.T. Scan Unit, a nephrology unit, a nuclear medicine department and a bone densitometer in orthopaedics. Hospital services include renal transplantation. The hospital is located near to the Thrissur and Punkunnam railway stations, the Kerala State Road Transport Corporation, and the private bus stand.

References

External links
Official Website

Hospital buildings completed in 1989
Hospitals in Thrissur
1989 establishments in Kerala
20th-century architecture in India